Marlies Mejías García (born 29 December 1992) is a Cuban road and track cyclist, who last rode for UCI Women's Team . At the 2012 Summer Olympics, she competed in the Women's Omnium, finishing in 8th place overall.

Major results

Road

2010
 2nd Road race, National Road Championships
2012
 3rd Road race, National Road Championships
 5th Road race, Pan American Road Championships
2013
 2nd  Road race, Pan American Road Championships
2014
 1st  Road race, Central American and Caribbean Games
 National Road Championships
2nd Road race
3rd Time trial
 5th Overall Tour Femenino de San Luis
1st Young rider classification
 7th Road race, Pan American Road Championships
2015
 1st  Road race, Pan American Road Championships
 National Road Championships
1st  Time trial
2nd Road race
 2nd  Road race, Pan American Games
2016
 3rd Road race, National Road Championships
2017
 1st Overall Tour Internacional Femenino de Uruguay
1st Stages 1, 2 & 4
 1st Overall Vuelta Femenina a San Juan
1st Stages 1, 2, 3 (ITT) & 4
 1st Overall Armed Forces Association Cycling Classic
1st Stage 1
 1st Overall Intelligentsia Cup
1st Stages 1, 2, 6, 7, 9 & 10
 1st Wilmington Grand Prix
 North Star Grand Prix
1st Stages 4 & 6
 1st Stage 9 Tour of America's Dairyland
 3rd  Time trial, Pan American Road Championships
2018
 1st  Time trial, National Road Championships
 Pan American Road Championships
3rd  Road race
8th Time trial
2021
 1st  Time trial, Pan American Road Championships

Track

2010
 3rd  Individual pursuit, UCI Junior Track Cycling World Championships
2011
 Pan American Track Championships
1st  Omnium
1st  Team pursuit
3rd  Individual pursuit
 3rd Omnium, Pan American Games
2012
 Pan American Track Championships
1st  Omnium
2nd  Individual pursuit
2013
 Pan American Track Championships
1st  Individual pursuit
1st  Omnium
1st  Team pursuit
 Copa Cuba de Pista
1st Omnium
1st Team pursuit (with Yudelmis Domínguez, Yumari González and Arlenis Sierra)
2014
 Central American and Caribbean Games
1st  Individual pursuit
1st  Omnium
1st  Team pursuit (with Yudelmis Domínguez, Yumari González and Arlenis Sierra)
1st  Team sprint (with Lisandra Guerra)
 Copa Cuba de Pista
1st Omnium
1st Scratch
3rd Points race
 2nd  Omnium, 2014–15 UCI Track Cycling World Cup, Guadalajara
 Pan American Track Championships
2nd  Individual pursuit
2nd  Omnium
2nd  Team pursuit (with Yudelmis Domínguez, Yoanka González and Yumari González)
3rd  Team sprint (with Lisandra Guerra)
2015
 1st Omnium, Copa Cuba de Pista
 Pan American Games
2nd  Team sprint (with Lisandra Guerra)
3rd  Omnium
2016
 Pan American Track Championships
1st  Omnium
2nd  Individual pursuit
 Copa Cuba de Pista
1st Omnium
1st Team pursuit (with Iraida Garcia Ocasio, Maylin Sánchez and Claudia Barco)
3rd Scratch
2017
 Pan American Track Championships
2nd  Scratch
3rd  Team pursuit
2018
 Central American and Caribbean Games
1st  Team pursuit (with Yudelmis Domínguez, Maylin Sánchez and Arlenis Sierra)
1st  Scratch
1st  Individual pursuit
 Pan American Track Championships
2nd  Individual pursuit
2nd  Scratch
3rd  Points race

References

External links

Living people
Cuban female cyclists
Olympic cyclists of Cuba
Cyclists at the 2012 Summer Olympics
Cyclists at the 2016 Summer Olympics
Cuban track cyclists
Cyclists at the 2015 Pan American Games
1992 births
Pan American Games medalists in cycling
Pan American Games silver medalists for Cuba
Pan American Games bronze medalists for Cuba
Central American and Caribbean Games gold medalists for Cuba
Competitors at the 2014 Central American and Caribbean Games
Competitors at the 2018 Central American and Caribbean Games
Central American and Caribbean Games medalists in cycling
Medalists at the 2011 Pan American Games
Medalists at the 2015 Pan American Games
21st-century Cuban women